Nidhi Uttam Pathak is an Indian television and film actress known for portraying Nandini Singhania in Star Plus's longest-running drama, Yeh Rishta Kya Kehlata Hai. She has also acted in Kasautii Zindagii Kay, Ek Boond Ishq, Dil Boley Oberoi and Aghori. In 2020, she made her film debut with Anubhav Sinha's social film, Thappad.

Early and personal life

Born in Kanpur, Uttar Pradesh, India, Uttam did schooling from St. Mary's Convent High School, Kanpur. She has an identical twin, Nishi. 

She moved to Mumbai to study Graphic Design and Animation.

Uttam married her childhood friend, singer and lyricist, Mohit Pathak, in Lucknow. The wedding was attended by her fellow co-stars from Yeh Rishta Kya Kehlata Hai.

Career

Television career

After playing an uncredited small role in Zee TV's Maayka in 2006, Uttam was set to star as the title character in Star Plus's Kasturi and make her debut in a leading character, but later Shubhangi Atre replaced her.

She finally debuted with Ekta Kapoor's popular soap, Kasautii Zindagii Kay for Star Plus as Tara in 2008.

In the same year, she played Sukanya in Doli Saja Ke.

In 2009, Uttam was cast in Star Plus's longest-running daily soap, Yeh Rishta Kya Kehlata Hai as Nandini Singhania which she eventually quit in 2016.

Along with her role of Nandini, she portrayed Meethi in Life OK's Ek Boond Ishq in 2013. 

In 2017, she appeared in a special appearance for Gul Khan's Dil Boley Oberoi on Star Plus as Jhanvi.

Next, Uttam was seen in Zee TV's Ek Tha Raja Ek Thi Rani, where she enacted the role of Sakshi.

In 2018, she returned to Yeh Rishta Kya Kehlata Hai, but finally confirmed her exit from it in 2019.

The following year, she appeared in the television series Aghori via Zee TV, portraying Priya.

Film career

Nidhi ventured into films with Suniel Shetty starrer Nanha Einstein in 2017. 

She appeared in Anubhav Sinha's drama, Thappad, starring Taapsee Pannu as a caring housewife who wants justice against domestic violence, when her husband slaps her unreasonably. Thappad was moderately profitable at the box office earning  against its .

Television shows

Films

References

External links
 

Indian television actresses
Living people
21st-century Indian actresses
Indian soap opera actresses
Indian film actresses
Actresses in Hindi television
Year of birth missing (living people)